DJ Mangas (born February 22, 1989) is an American football coach who is currently the offensive coordinator at the University at Buffalo.

Playing career 
Mangas played college football at William & Mary from 2007 to 2011, where he was a former walk-on who played wide receiver and also served as the team's emergency quarterback.

Coaching career

Early coaching career 
Mangas began his career as the quarterbacks coach at Hampden–Sydney College in 2012, and was later the running backs coach at Georgetown. He would return to his alma mater William & Mary in 2014 as their running backs coach on the recommendation of former college teammate and then-William & Mary linebackers coach Joe Brady. He was promoted to offensive coordinator in 2017, and was one of the youngest coordinators in Division I football at 28.

LSU 
Mangas joined the coaching staff at LSU in 2019, serving as the right-hand man to Brady, who was the Tigers' passing game coordinator.

Carolina Panthers 
Mangas followed Brady, who was hired as the offensive coordinator of the Carolina Panthers, and joined him as a coaching assistant.

LSU (second stint) 
Mangas was rehired as the passing game coordinator at LSU in 2021, joining Panthers quarterbacks coach Jake Peetz, who was named the Tigers offensive coordinator.

UCF 
In 2022, Mangas was hired as a defensive analyst at UCF.

Buffalo 
On January 14, 2023, Mangas was hired as the offensive coordinator at Buffalo.

References

External links 
 
 LSU Tigers profile

1989 births
Living people
Sportspeople from Arlington County, Virginia
People from Chantilly, Virginia
Players of American football from Virginia
Coaches of American football from Virginia
American football quarterbacks
American football wide receivers
William & Mary Tribe football players
Hampden–Sydney Tigers football coaches
Georgetown Hoyas football coaches
William & Mary Tribe football coaches
LSU Tigers football coaches
Carolina Panthers coaches
UCF Knights football coaches
Buffalo Bulls football coaches